The Church of St. Thomas is a Roman Catholic church complex in Jessenland Township, Minnesota, United States.  It consists of an 1870 church, 1878 rectory, and a hillside cemetery whose oldest tombstone is dated 1856.  Together they are remnants of the very first agricultural settlement established by Irish Americans in Minnesota, founded here along the Minnesota River in 1852.  The complex was listed on the National Register of Historic Places in 1991 for its local significance in the theme of European ethnic heritage.  It was nominated for its association with Minnesota's first Irish-American farming settlement and one of the first agricultural communities in Sibley County.

See also
 List of Catholic churches in the United States
 National Register of Historic Places listings in Sibley County, Minnesota

References

19th-century Roman Catholic church buildings in the United States
1870 establishments in Minnesota
Buildings and structures in Sibley County, Minnesota
Cemeteries on the National Register of Historic Places in Minnesota
Churches in the Roman Catholic Diocese of New Ulm
Churches on the National Register of Historic Places in Minnesota
Greek Revival church buildings in Minnesota
Irish-American culture in Minnesota
National Register of Historic Places in Sibley County, Minnesota
Roman Catholic churches completed in 1870